Mount Skinner may refer to:

Mount Skinner (Antarctica), a mountain in Antarctica

Mount Skinner, Northern Territory, a mountain in the Northern Territory of Australia

Mount Skinner Station, a cattle station in the Northern Territory of Australia